The 2002-03 Top 16 season was the top level of French club rugby in 2002-03.The competition was played by 16 team. 
In the first phase, two pool of 8 was Played. The first 4 of each pool was admitted to the "top 8", the tournament for the title, the other to a relegation tournament.

First round 
(3 point for victories, 2 point for drawn, 1 point for losses)

Pool A

Pool B

Pool Relegation 
The teams sum  to the point obtained in the first round, the point obtained in the matches played with the 4 team from other group (hone and away).

Bordeaux-Begles was relegated o the Pro D2 for 2003-04 by DNACG ( federal commission for finance control of the professional clubs due to financial irregularities.

Bordeaux was one of the four teams that always played in the first division of French championship after the First World War, with Toulouse, Agen and Montferrand. So Béziers was saved to relegation.

Top 8 
Two Pool of 4 teams. The first two of each pool were qualified for semifinals. Them and the third also qualified for 2004–05 Heineken Cup

Semifinals

Final 

Stade Français: Sylvain Marconnet, Benoît August, Pieter de Villiers, David Auradou, Mike James, Pierre Rabadan, Raphaël Jéchoux, Patrick Tabacco, Fabien Galthié, Diego Dominguez, Thomas Lombard, Stéphane Glas, Brian Liebenberg, Christophe Dominici, Ignacio Corleto - Replacements : Mathieu Blin, Pablo Lemoine, Rémy Martin, Jérôme Fillol, Cliff Mytton, Arnaud Marchois, Arthur Gomes

Toulouse : Benoît Lecouls, Yannick Bru, Patrice Collazo, David Gérard, Fabien Pelous, Trevor Brennan, Jean Bouilhou, Christian Labit, Frédéric Michalak, Yann Delaigue, Vincent Clerc, Yannick Jauzion, Émile Ntamack, Xavier Garbajosa, Clément Poitrenaud - Replacements : William Servat, Jean-Baptiste Poux, Grégory Lamboley, Jean-Baptiste Élissalde, Cédric Desbrosse, Cédric Heymans, Finau Maka

External links
 LNR.fr

Top 14 seasons
   
France